CBD Rail Link may refer to:

City Rail Link, a proposed rail tunnel in Auckland, New Zealand
Redfern to Chatswood railway line, a proposed rail link in Sydney, Australia
CBD Relief Line, a similar proposed rail link in Sydney, Australia

See also
CBD (disambiguation)